Balitang Bayan Numero Uno (National News: Number One) was the flagship newscast of AM station DZRH in the Philippines. It was anchored mainly by Joe Taruc. The program was also simulcast over Radyo Natin, several Hot FM stations and RHTV nationwide.

Anchors

Main anchor
 Joe Taruc (1987–2011)

Co-anchors
 Rey Langit (5am edition, 1987–1992)
 Deo Macalma (In Action edition, 1987–1992)
 Fidela "Tiya Dely" Magpayo (5am edition, 1992–1997)
 Ali Sotto (5am edition, 1997–1999)
 Jay Sonza (In Action edition, 1999–2004)
 Rey Sibayan (5am edition, 2004–2011)
 Jun Legaspi (Weekend edition, 1991–2000)
 Ruth Abao-Espinosa (Weekend edition, 2001–2004)
 Henry Uri (Weekend edition, 2004–2006) 
 Milky Rigonan (5am edition, 2007–2011)
 Andy Vital (In Action edition 1996–1998; 5am edition, 1999–2004; 6am edition 2004–2011)

Segment anchors
 Nino Padilla – Ratsada Probinsya (1995–2011)
 Chino Trinidad – Sports Ngayon (1991–1998)
 Tita Swarding – Balitang Bayan Showbiz Chika (1991–2011)

See also
DZRH

Philippine radio programs
1991 radio programme debuts